"Sympathy" is a song by the Goo Goo Dolls. The song was used as a promotional single released from their album Gutterflower. The song appeared on the soundtrack to the film A Cinderella Story and also in an episode of the show "Charmed". It was shortened to about 2:48 on the soundtrack with some of the lyrics edited for the film's target audience.

Track listings
Promotional CD single
"Sympathy" — 2:58

Promotional 7"
Warner Bros. 16663
"Sympathy"
"Think About Me"

Music video
The "Sympathy" music video was shot in Las Vegas, Nevada in 2002 and produced by Tony Bongiovi. The video, mostly taking place in the back of a taxi cab, is described by the band as a "guerrilla video." The video was slightly based on the T.V. show Taxicab Confessions, as the band's previous touring keyboardist, Dave Schulz, was featured in an episode of the show and as a result was fired from the band. In the video, singer/guitarist John, is supposed to be "invisible" to the other people who come and go in the taxi.

Charts

Certifications

References

Goo Goo Dolls songs
2003 singles
Songs written by John Rzeznik
Song recordings produced by Rob Cavallo
2003 songs
Warner Records singles